Christian Godard (born March 24, 1932, in Paris) is a French cartoonist of the series Martin Milan for Tintin magazine.

He has also worked on the following series, among others:
 Le vagabond des limbes
 Norbert and Kari
 Toupet
 The Cyberkiller
 Oki

References

External links
Christian Godard at Lambiek's Comiclopedia

French comics artists
1932 births
Living people